VOW may mean:

Vow
 VOW, The Voice of a Woman – organization showcasing women filmmakers, artists and thought leaders through festivals, awards and talks.
 VOW, the SAME code for a Volcano Warning
Vow (Garbage song)
Village on Wheels. Exclusive tourist trains in India (especially catering to the budget tourists, Ŗhence the name)
Virtual Office Website